( – August 13, 1287) was a rensho of the Kamakura shogunate from 1283 to 1287.

Bibliography
北条氏研究会「北条氏系譜人名辞典」（新人物往来社）
森幸夫「北条重時」（吉川弘文館・人物叢書）

1240s births
1287 deaths
Hōjō clan
People of Kamakura-period Japan